The 1920 Drake Bulldogs football team was an American football team that represented Drake University as a member of the Missouri Valley Conference (MVC) during the 1920 college football season. In its third and final season under head coach M. B. Banks, the team compiled a 4–5–1 record (1–3–1 against MVC opponents), finished fifth in the conference, and outscored opponents by a total of 149 to 40.

Schedule

References

Drake
Drake Bulldogs football seasons
Drake Bulldogs football